The Bangladesh Cricket board (abbreviated as BCB) is the governing body of cricket in Bangladesh. It became an associate member of the International Cricket Council (ICC) in 1977 and a full member on June 26, 2000. BCB has three teams which represent Bangladesh in international cricket, which are Bangladesh Men's national cricket team, Bangladesh women's national cricket team and Bangladesh under-19 cricket team.

The board has its headquarters at the Sher-e-Bangla National Cricket Stadium in Mirpur, Dhaka.

History
The Bangladesh Cricket Board was founded in 1972 as the Bangladesh Cricket Control Board. Its first constitution was drafted in 1976. The board changed its name, dropping "Control" from its title, in January 2007. Since 2003 telecommunications company Grameenphone has sponsored the men and women's national teams. Between 2007 and 2011 they invested  in developing sport in the country. In 2006 the Board established an academy to encourage the development of young players. The Board issues central contracts and match fees to the national players.

Regional cricket associations
In the 2022 Annual General Meeting, BCB President Nazmul Hassan Papon announced to have amended the board's constitution to make way for seven regional cricket associations for Barisal, Chattogram, Comilla, Dhaka, Khulna, Rajshahi, Rangpur and Sylhet. Larger regional bodies will have 11 members while smaller bodies will consist of 7 members.

Teams
 Bangladesh national cricket team
 Bangladesh women's national cricket team
 Bangladesh national under-23 cricket team
 Bangladesh national under-19 cricket team
 Bangladesh women's national under-19 cricket team
 Bangladesh A cricket team
 Bangladesh Tigers

Finances
According to BCB Activity report 2017–20, the board has earned around 29 million from team sponsors, media and other rights for the mentioned period (2017–20), while they earned around 33 million during the period of 2010–16.

Board members

Presidents
The President of the BCB is appointed by the Government of Bangladesh.

The following is a list of presidents of the BCB:

Domestic competitions
BCB or its subsidiaries organise following domestic cricket tournaments.

Regular competitions
 Bangladesh Premier League – Bangladesh's premier franchise-based Twenty20 cricket league, first since 2012.
 Dhaka Premier Division Cricket League – also known as Dhaka Premier League is a List A cricket league, first held in 2013-14 and participated by various cricket clubs of Dhaka.
 National Cricket League – It is Bangladesh's oldest domestic first class cricket competition. It was first held in 1999–2000. It's 50-over version was first played in 2000-01 and was last held in 2010–11, being superseded by Dhaka Premier Division Cricket League since 2013–14.
 Bangladesh Cricket League – It is Bangladesh's second domestic first class cricket competition. It was first held in 2012-13 and played between four zones East Zone, Central Zone, North Zone and South Zone.
 Dhaka Premier Division Twenty20 Cricket League – It is Twenty20 version of Dhaka Premier league cricket competition, but unlike its 50-over format, it consists only local players in order to find out promising players from domestic arena for T20 cricket. it was first played in 2018–19.

Occasional competitions
 2013–14 Victory Day T20 Cup – a Twenty20 competition played only in 2013, between four different teams from Dhaka Premier Division Cricket League.
 2020–21 BCB President's Cup – a 50-over competition played by current national team players and a few emerging players, being divided into three teams (i.e. Mahmudullah XI, Najmul XI and Tamim XI).
 2020–21 Bangabandhu T20 Cup – a five franchise based Twenty20 competition. After sports were affected due to COVID–19 pandemic, BCB announced that the tournament would be used for the criteria to select players for the T20I matches against the West Indies, scheduled to be played in early 2021.
 2021-22 BCB Academy Cup – There are 2 tiers in the competition (Divisional & National). Divisional and Dhaka Metro champions and runner-ups will qualify for the National round. A total of 88 matches will be played.

See also 
 Cricket in Bangladesh
 Bangladesh national cricket team
 Bangladesh national women's cricket team
 List of cricket grounds in Bangladesh

References

External links
 Official website
 New perspective around Bangladesh - BCB president
 Bangladesh Cricket Schedule, Upcoming matches 

Cricket administration
Cricket administration in Bangladesh
Sport in Bangladesh
Cricket in Asia
Sports organizations established in 1972
Cricket